Propylea luteopustulata, is a species of lady beetle found in India, Nepal, Himalayas, Tibet, Southern China, Sri Lanka, Myanmar, and Vietnam..

Body length is about 5 to 5.3 mm. Elytral pattern is highly variable. It is found on host plants such as Bidens pilosa, and Galinsoga parviflora. It is a predator of many aphid species such as, Aphis craccivora, Aphis gossypii, Aphis rumicis, Brachycaudus helichrysi, Brevicoryne brassicae, Lipaphis pseudobrassicae and Myzus persicae.

References 

Coccinellidae
Insects of Sri Lanka
Beetles described in 1850